Hannah M. Pingree (born October 18, 1976) is a Democratic politician from the U.S. state of Maine and daughter of Maine politician Chellie Pingree. She served four terms in the State Legislature, including one as Speaker of the House, before being forced to leave office by state term limits. In the Legislature she represented 10 islands and coastal towns. She was the second woman to serve as Speaker of the House in Maine.

Early life and education
Pingree grew up on the island of North Haven, where her father Charlie Pingree is a boat-builder. She graduated from North Haven Community School and Brown University. She was a 1998-1999 Fellow for Leadership in Public Affairs for the Coro Foundation in New York City.

Political career
Prior to serving in the Legislature, she was a fundraiser for the unsuccessful United States Senate campaign of her mother Chellie Pingree, who now represents Maine's 1st congressional district in the United States House of Representatives. She also worked for two years in New York City as the political director and "Election 2000" producer for iVillage.com, the largest political internet site for women.

In her third term, Pingree became the third woman in Maine history to serve as House Majority Leader and the youngest woman ever to hold the position.  She is the second youngest person to hold the position in state history. After leaving the legislature, Pingree now manages the family inn and restaurant, Nebo Lodge, and serves on the North Haven Community School Board.

References

Further reading

External links
Hannah Pingree Interview Interview with Maine Speaker of the House Hannah Pingree
Representative Hannah Pingree official campaign site
 

1976 births
Brown University alumni
Living people
Majority leaders of the Maine House of Representatives
People from North Haven, Maine
Speakers of the Maine House of Representatives
Democratic Party members of the Maine House of Representatives
Women state legislators in Maine
21st-century American women